Emmanuel Atta Nyamaa Asante (born 2 May 1995) is a Ghanaian professional footballer who currently plays as a defender for Bechem United in the Ghana Premier League.

Career
Emmanuel Asante started his career with Bechem United. He has played for several Ghanaian teams including Asante Kotoko S.C. and Accra Great Olympics. He also played for Daring Club Motema Pembe in DR Congo.

International career
In November 2013, coach Maxwell Konadu invited him to be a part of the Ghana squad for the 2013 WAFU Nations Cup. He helped the team to a first-place finish after Ghana beat Senegal by three goals to one.

References

External links 
 

Ghanaian footballers
Living people
Association football fullbacks
Ghana international footballers
WAFU Nations Cup players
Asante Kotoko S.C. players
Accra Great Olympics F.C. players
Bechem United F.C. players
Daring Club Motema Pembe players
1995 births